This is a list of international football governing bodies.

Global
FIFA - Fédération Internationale de Football Association - 211 members - founded in 1904, represents nations from around the world, and is the overall governing body of recognised international football. Its premier tournament is the quadrennial FIFA World Cup.
ConIFA - Confederation of Independent Football Associations - 24 members - founded in 2013, represents nations, dependencies, unrecognized states, minorities and regions not affiliated to FIFA. The main tournament is the ConIFA World Football Cup.

Defunct 
NF-Board - New Federation Board - 18 members + 14 provisional - founded in 2003,  represents nations, dependencies, unrecognized states, minorities, stateless peoples, regions and micronations not affiliated to FIFA. The main tournament was the VIVA World Cup. This organization was dissolved in January 2013.

Continental

FIFA Confederations
FIFA-member football associations are formed together into continental confederations, which organize continental national and club competitions.
AFC - Asian Football Confederation - 47 members - founded in 1954, represents Asian nations in football. The main tournament is the AFC Asian Cup.
CAF - Confederation of African Football - 54 members + 2 associate - founded in 1957 - represents African nations in football. The main tournament is the African Cup of Nations.
CONCACAF - Confederation of North, Central American and Caribbean Association Football - 41 members - founded in 1961 represents North American, Central American and Caribbean nations. The main tournament is the CONCACAF Gold Cup.
CONMEBOL - Confederación Sudamericana de Fútbol - 10 members - founded in 1916 represents South American nations in football. The main tournament is the Copa América.
OFC - Oceania Football Confederation - 11 members + 2 associate - founded in 1966 represents Oceanian nations in football. The main tournament is the OFC Nations Cup.
UEFA - Union of European Football Associations - 55 members  - founded in 1954 represents European nations in football. The main tournament is the UEFA European Championship, also known as UEFA Euro.

Non-FIFA Confederations
Two continental confederations exist within the NF-Board.
CSANF - Consejo Sudamericano de Nuevas Federaciones - 4 members + 1 associate - founded in 2007 represents teams not affiliated to FIFA in South America.

Inter-continental
The following confederations consist of FIFA member associations that cross continental boundaries.
UAFA - Union of Arab Football Associations - 22 members - founded in 1974, represents Arab nations from Africa and Asia. The main tournament is the Arab Cup.

Regional

Africa
Affiliated to CAF
CECAFA-Council of East and Central African Football Associations - 10 members + 1 associate -  founded in 1927, represents nations generally regarded as forming the regions of East Africa and some nations of Central Africa. The main tournament is the CECAFA Cup.
COSAFA - Council of Southern African Football Associations - 14 members + 1 associate - founded in 1997, represents nations generally regarded as forming Southern Africa, as well as island states off the coast of Southern Africa. The main tournament is the COSAFA Cup.
WAFU (UFOA) - Union of West African Football Associations - 8 members - founded in 1977, one of two bodies that represent nations in West Africa. The main tournament is the WAFU Nations Cup.
UNAF - Union of North African Federations - 5 members - founded in 2005, represents nations regarded as forming North Africa.
UNIFFAC - Central African Football Federations' Union - 8 members - represents some of the nations that form Central Africa. The main tournament is the CEMAC Cup.

Asia
Affiliated to AFC
WAFF - West Asian Football Federation - 12 members - founded in 2000, represents nations at the western extremity of the continent. The main tournament is the WAFF Championship.
AGCFF - Arab Gulf Cup Football Federation - 8 members - founded in 2016, represents the participating nations of the Arabian Gulf Cup, all of which are also members of WAFF.
EAFF - East Asian Football Federation - 10 members - founded in 2002, represents nations generally agreed to constitute the "far east". The main tournament is the EAFF E-1 Football Championship.
SAFF - South Asian Football Federation - 7 members - founded in 1997, represents nations from South Asia. The main tournament is the SAFF Championship.
CAFA - Central Asian Football Association - 6 members - founded in 2015, represents nations from Central Asia. The main tournament is the CAFA Championship.
AFF - ASEAN Football Federation - 12 members - founded in 1984, represents nations from Southeast Asia. The main tournament is the AFF Championship.

North America
Affiliated to CONCACAF
CFU - Caribbean Football Union - 30 members -  represents all nations in the Caribbean. The main tournament is the Caribbean Cup.
LIFA - Leeward Islands Football Association - 11 members - founded in 1949, represents nations of the Leeward archipelago and is affiliated to CFU. The main tournament is the Leeward Islands Tournament.
WIFA - Windward Islands Football Association - 4 members - represents nations of the Windward archipelago and is affiliated to CFU. The main tournament is the Windward Islands Tournament.
NAFU - North American Football Union - 3 members - represents the three sovereign nations of North America. The main tournament was the now defunct North American Nations Cup.
UNCAF Union Centroamericana de Fútbol - 7 members - represents the seven nations of Central America. The main tournament is the UNCAF Nations Cup.

Defunct
CCCF - Confederacion Centroamericana y del Caribe de Futbol - 37 members - dissolved in 1961, represented Central America and Caribbean region and was directly affiliated to FIFA. The main tournament was the CCCF Championship.
CENF - Confederation of European New Federations - 0 members - founded in 2007 and dissolved in 2008, represented teams not affiliated to FIFA in Europe, and was affiliated to NF-Board. The main tournament was the CENF Cup, but was never played.
FIFI - Federation of International Football Independents - 5 members - represents nations, dependencies and unrecognized states not affiliated to FIFA. The main tournament was the FIFI Wild Cup.
IFU - International Football Union - 2 provisional members - founded in 2009 as an international football confederation for nations and territories not admitted to FIFA, was dissolved in 2010.
NAFC - North American Football Confederation - 4 members - founded in 1946 and dissolved in 1961, represented the North American region and was directly affiliated to FIFA. The main tournament was the NAFC Championship.
PFC Panamerican Football Confederation - 50 members - founded in 1946 represents teams from America. The main tournament is the Panamerican Championship.
 UIAFA - Union Internationale Amateur de Football Association - 3, later 5 members - founded in 1908 and dissolved in 1912. Main tournament was the Amateur European Championship.

External links
Official Organisations (incl. National Federations) at the RSSSF
Football Federations Around the Globe, Soccerlens.com